Lactiplantibacillus is a genus of lactic acid bacteria.

Species
The genus Lactiplantibacillus comprises the following species:
 Lactiplantibacillus argentoratensis (Bringel et al. 2005) Liu and Gu 2020
 Lactiplantibacillus daoliensis (Liu and Gu 2019) Zheng et al. 2020
 Lactiplantibacillus daowaiensis (Liu and Gu 2019) Zheng et al. 2020
 Lactiplantibacillus dongliensis (Liu and Gu 2019) Zheng et al. 2020
 Lactiplantibacillus fabifermentans (De Bruyne et al. 2009) Zheng et al. 2020
 Lactiplantibacillus garii Zheng et al. 2020
 Lactiplantibacillus herbarum (Mao et al. 2015) Zheng et al. 2020
 Lactiplantibacillus modestisalitolerans (Miyashita et al. 2015) Zheng et al. 2020
 Lactiplantibacillus mudanjiangensis (Gu et al. 2013) Zheng et al. 2020
 Lactiplantibacillus nangangensis (Liu and Gu 2019) Zheng et al. 2020
 Lactiplantibacillus paraplantarum (Curk et al. 1996) Zheng et al. 2020
 Lactiplantibacillus pentosus (Zanoni et al. 1987) Zheng et al. 2020
 Lactiplantibacillus pingfangensis (Liu and Gu 2019) Zheng et al. 2020
 Lactiplantibacillus plajomi (Miyashita et al. 2015) Zheng et al. 2020
 Lactiplantibacillus plantarum (Orla-Jensen 1919) Zheng et al. 2020
 Lactiplantibacillus songbeiensis (Liu and Gu 2019) Zheng et al. 2020
 Lactiplantibacillus xiangfangensis (Gu et al. 2012) Zheng et al. 2020

Phylogeny
The currently accepted taxonomy is based on the List of Prokaryotic names with Standing in Nomenclature and the phylogeny is based on whole-genome sequences.

References

Lactobacillaceae
Bacteria genera